The Helpmann Academy is a unique collaborative partnership, unifying the skills and resources of South Australia’s universities. Since 1994 the Helpmann Academy has been supporting emerging creatives, promoting South Australia as a centre for excellence in creative education, and contributing to the artistic community of the state. It is named in honour of Sir Robert Helpmann, an Australian ballet dancer, actor, director, and choreographer who was born in Mount Gambier, South Australia.

The Helpmann Academy Graduate Exhibition is an annual celebration of the strongest creative voices emerging from South Australia’s contemporary art scene and has established a reputation as the showcase exhibition of South Australia’s best emerging artists. Showcasing the talent of the top emerging artists from Flinders University, and the University of South Australia and selected by a distinguished independent panel, the exhibition features works by graduating artists across a range of creative disciplines including ceramics, glass, painting, jewellery, photography, printmaking, video, installation, sonic art, fashion, performance art and sculpture. The Helpmann Academy Graduate Exhibition remains one of the most significant opportunities for emerging creatives in the country due to award donors. In 2022, 18 awards valued at over $71,000 were presented.

Each year the Helpmann Academy Jazz Awards are held to honour and celebrate outstanding musicians – both graduates and final year students – from the University of Adelaide’s Elder Conservatorium of Music. In 2021 eight emerging jazz musicians were presented with $27,500 in awards.

Governance
Helpmann Academy's Board of Governors consists of Vice Chancellors from South Australia's three universities or their delegates, and leading representatives from the arts, creative, cultural and business sectors.

Funding
Helpmann Academy is funded by the partner universities, State Government, philanthropic partners, donors, grants and a small number of businesses, corporate partners.

Overseas connections
The Helpmann Academy has strong links with arts institutions across the globe including, Italy, France, China, India, and New Zealand. Exchanges and residencies take place in the visual arts, drama, dance, and music. Visits by performers and artists from around the world are also encouraged.

Partners 
The Helpmann Academy is a partnership between, Flinders University, College of Humanities, Arts and Social Sciences; University of Adelaide, Elder Conservatorium of Music; and University of South Australia, UniSA Creative.

External links
Helpmann Academy - empowering emerging creatives

Helpmann Academy's partner universities
Flinders University
University of Adelaide
University of South Australia

Helpmann Academy, The
Australian tertiary institutions
University of Adelaide
University of South Australia
Flinders University